The Dean Forest Act 1667 (19 & 20 Car 2 c 8) was an Act of the Parliament of England, concerning the place of forests in English land law.

Repeal
The whole Act, so far as unrepealed, was repealed by section 1(4) of, and the Schedule to, the Wild Creatures and Forest Laws Act 1971.

See also
English land law
Dean Forest Act 1819
Dean Forest (Encroachments) Act 1838
Dean Forest Act 1842
Dean Forest Act 1861

References

Halsbury's Statutes,
 

Acts of the Parliament of England
English forest law
Forest of Dean
1667 in law
1667 in England
17th century in Gloucestershire